This list of Slovenian physicians includes notable physicians and surgeons, medical scientists and medical doctors from Slovenia or its territory, and of Slovene descent. Physicians of all specialities may be listed here.

Alphabetical list


A 
 Bojan Accetto
 Marjan Ahčin
 Avgust Andrioli
 Vane Antolič

B
 Oton Bajc
 Jože Balažic
 Sašo Baričevič
 Igor Bartenjev
 Dušan Bavdek, Sr.
 Marjan Bilban
 Demeter Bleiweis
 Karel Bleiweis
 Robert Blumauer, Sr.
 Aleš Blinc
 Franja Bojc Bidovec
 Peter Bossman
 Anton Brecelj
 Bogdan Brecelj
 Janez Krstnik Fanton de Brunn

C, Č 
 Franc Čelešnik
 Anton Cerar
 Bojan Čerček
 Draga Černelč
 Mirko Černič
 Boris Cibic
 Ivan Cibic
 Anton Cizelj
 Franc Copf
 France Cukjati

D 
 Franc Debevec (1915)
 Peter Defranceschi
 Jernej Demšar
 Franc Derganc
 Mirko Derganc
 Vinko Dolenc
 Aleksander Doplihar

E 
 Jana Govc Eržen

F
 Franc Farčnik
 Zlatko Fras

G 
 Marko Gerbec
 Borut Geršak
 Marko Godina
 Ivan Gossiak
 Johann Benedikt Gründel
 Štefek Grmec
 Slavko Grum

H
 Belsazar Hacquet
 Marko Hawlina
 Matija Horvat

I 
 Alojz Ihan
 Alojz Ipavec
 Benjamin Ipavec
 Gustav Ipavec
 Josip Ipavec

J
 Andrej Janež
 Janez Janež
 
 Berta Jereb
 Franc Ksaver Jugovic
 Pavla Jerina Lah

K 
 Gordana Živčec Kalan
 Vinko Kambič
 Kurt Kancler
 Zlatka Kanič
 Janez Kanoni - Ivan
 Dušan Keber
 Vincenc Kern
 Vasja Klavora
 Valentina Kobe
 Andreja Kocijančič
 Srečko Koren
 Marjan Kordaš
 Pavle Kornhauser
 Ivan Krajnc

L 
 Božidar Lavrič
 Boštjan Likar
 Miha Likar
 Franz Wilhelm Lippich
 Danilo Lokar
 Bronislava Lotrič - Pentek

M 
 Bogomil Magajna
 Anton Makovic
 Aleksander Manohin
 Črt Marinček
 Andrej Marušič
 Dorjan Marušič
 Johann Matoschek
 Helena Meden-Vrtovec
 Janez Milčinski

N 
 Leopold Nathan
 Robert Neubauer
 Franc Novak
 Živa Novak-Antolič
 Marko Noč

O 
 Ivo Obrez
 Ivan Oražen

P 
 Natalis Pagliaruzzi
 Igor Pavlin
 Andreas Perlach
 Damijan Perne
 Zvezdan Pirtošek
 Marko Anton Plenčič
 Janez Podobnik
 Mario Ponikvar
 Franci Planinšek
 Pavel Poredoš
 Janko Predan
 Friderik Pregl

Q 
 Janez Pavel Qualiza

R 
 Božena Nataša Ravnihar
 Dean Ravnik
 Blaž Rozman
 Ciril Rozman
 Zvonimir Rudolf
 Tomaž Rott

S, Š 
 Santorio Santorio
 Anton Schwab
 Giovanni Antonio Scopoli
 Viljem Ščuka
 Dušan Franc Šeber
 Alfred Šerko
 Anton Širca
 Janez Sketelj
 Edo Šlajmer
 Zvonka Zupanič Slavec
 Majda Marčič Smerdu
 Vladimir Smrkolj
 Jurij Šorli
 Mirko Špacapan
 Dušan Štajer
 Vito Starc
 Jurij Starovašnik
 Igor Švab

T
 Igor Tavčar
 Stanko Tavčar
 Martina Tomori
 Mirko Toš

V
 Vladimir Valentinuzzi
 David Vodušek
 Nado Vodopija
 Gregor Voglar
 Andrej Vogler
 Viktor Volčjak
 Josip Vošnjak
 Anton Vrhovec
 Bojan Vrtovec

Z, Ž

 Janez Mihael Žagar
 Mihael Zajec
 Tine Zajec
 Miha Žargi
 Radoslav Žargi
 Herbert Zaveršnik
 Franjo Zdravič
 Aleš Žemva
 Darko Žiberna
 Slavko Ziherl
 Jože Žitnik
 Franc Žnidaršič
 Marjeta Zorc
 Milan Žumer
 Franc Zupanc
 Andrej Župančič
 Marko Zupančič
 Franc Žvanut
 Mateja Žvanut

See also

List of physicians
List of Slovenian scientists
List of Slovenian inventors
Science and technology in Slovenia

 
Physicians
Slovenian